The 1989 Dartmouth Big Green football team was an American football team that represented Dartmouth College during the 1989 NCAA Division I-AA football season. Dartmouth finished fourth in the Ivy League.

In their third season under head coach Eugene "Buddy" Teevens, the Big Green compiled a 5–5 record and were outscored 178 to 170. Mark Johnson and Kevin Luensmann were the team captains.

The Big Green's 4–3 conference record placed fourth in the Ivy League standings. Dartmouth outscored Ivy opponents 115 to 82.

Dartmouth played its home games at Memorial Field on the college campus in Hanover, New Hampshire.

Schedule

References

Dartmouth
Dartmouth Big Green football seasons
Dartmouth Big Green football